Jim Beavers is an American country music songwriter.

Early life and education

Jim Beavers grew up in Garland and Jacksonville, Texas.  His educational background includes a BBA from Baylor University  and an MBA from Vanderbilt University.

Career
Beavers moved to Nashville in 1991 to pursue a career on the business side of music.  His work experience prior to songwriting includes stints as director of marketing for Capitol Records and Virgin Records, touring musician with Lee Ann Womack, and professor at Middle Tennessee State University.

Since 2002, Beavers has focused primarily on songwriting.  He has had dozens of songs recorded by artists such as Chris Stapleton, Luke Bryan, Dierks Bentley, Tim McGraw, Hootie and the Blowfish, Toby Keith, Gary Allan, Blake Shelton, Miranda Lambert, Josh Turner, Billy Currington, Trace Adkins, Brooks & Dunn, Brad Paisley, and Faith Hill among others.

Beavers' compositions have received multiple Country Music Association (CMA), Academy of Country Music, Broadcast Music, Inc., and Nashville Songwriters Association International nominations and awards.

Beavers is currently chairman of the CMA and has co-written nine number-one songs.

Singles written by Jim Beavers

 "High Note" – Dierks Bentley feat. Billy Strings
 "Richest Man" (IBMA Song of the Year 2021) – Balsam Range
 "Pick Her Up" – Hot Country Knights featuring  Travis Tritt
 "Hold On" – Hootie & the Blowfish
 "Just a Phase" – Adam Craig
 "Parachute" – Chris Stapleton
 "Love You Like That" – Canaan Smith
 "Drink a Beer" – Luke Bryan
 "American Heart" – Faith Hill
"5-1-5-0" – Dierks Bentley
"Lovin' You Is Fun" – Easton Corbin
 "Red Solo Cup" – Toby Keith
 "Am I the Only One" – Dierks Bentley
 "Felt Good on My Lips" – Tim McGraw
 "Why Don't We Just Dance" – Josh Turner
 "Sideways" – Dierks Bentley
 "Trying to Stop Your Leaving" – Dierks Bentley
 "Don't" – Billy Currington
 "Watching Airplanes" – Gary Allan
 "How Am I Doin'" – Dierks Bentley (as "Writer X")

References

American country songwriters
American male songwriters
Living people
Songwriters from Texas
Baylor University alumni
Place of birth missing (living people)
Year of birth missing (living people)
Vanderbilt University alumni